Alkylglycerone phosphate synthase (alkyldihydroxyacetonephosphate synthase, alkyldihydroxyacetone phosphate synthetase, alkyl DHAP synthetase, alkyl-DHAP, dihydroxyacetone-phosphate acyltransferase, DHAP-AT) is an enzyme associated with Type 3 Rhizomelic chondrodysplasia punctata. This enzyme catalyses the following chemical reaction

 1-acyl-glycerone 3-phosphate + a long-chain alcohol  an alkyl-glycerone 3-phosphate + a long-chain acid anion

References

External links 

EC 2.5.1